Sikh titles are honorifics appended to the names of members of the Sikh community. Their form may be prefixes or suffixes to names, or the title may be used alone, in place of the name. They may denote social status or relationship, occupational field, or religious standing. When used as a form of address, they are often intended to convey respect.

List of titles and honorifics

Unisex
 Sri
 Shri

Men

 Bhai
 Bhai Sahab
 Choudhary 
 Dakoo or Daaku, 'dacoit'; for example: Daaku Man Singh
 Das, a surname regularly encountered among Sikhs, which has also been applied as a title, signifying "devotee" or "votary" (in the context of religion); also, Dasa
 Gyani or Giani
 Jathedar, 'Captain', 'leader'
 Halwai, 'chef'
 Haqeem or Ḥakīm, 'doctor'
 Kunwar
 Maharaja 
 Ragi
 Raja
 Rai
 Rana
 Rao
 Sardar, 'Mr'
 Sahib
 Singh
 Swargwasi, 'deceased [male]' ('late' in English)
 Thakur
 Ustad, 'Master' (teacher)
 Yuvraj
 Zamindar

Women

 Bibi, in English 'Miss'
 Bhehen ji
 Kaur 
 Maharani
 Masterani, in English teacher
 Rani 
 Saheb
 Sardarni, in English 'Mrs'
 Swargwasi 'deceased [female]'/'late' in English)
 Thakurani

Use for historical or religious figures 
 Bhagat 'holy person': Bhagat Puran Singh
 Bhai, 'brother': Bhai Gurdas, Bhai Santokh (Suraj Parkash)
 Guru 'revered teacher (of a disciple)': Sikh Gurus
 Gyani, Giani 'philosopher': Giani Sant Singh Maskeen
 Sant, 'enlightened' or 'holy': Sant Fateh Singh
 Shaheed, 'martyr':  Baba Deep Singh, Bhagat Singh

See also
 Indian honorifics
 Sikh names
 Martyrdom in Sikhism

References

External links
 https://web.archive.org/web/20080726175721/http://sgpc.net/glossary/Jathedar.asp
 http://www.maskeensahib.com/

Sikh terminology
Titles in India